FUDOSI or FUDOESI (French: Fédération Universelle des Ordres et Sociétés Initiatiques, latin: Federatio Universalis Dirigens Ordines Societatesque Initiationis) was a federation of autonomous esoteric or mystical orders and societies, founded on August 14, 1934, in Brussels, Belgium, and disbanded in 1951. It was opposed by the similarly named Fédération Universelle des Ordres, Fraternités et Sociétés Initiatiques (FUDOFSI).

Background
FUDOSI was an attempt to create a federation of mystical orders with the mission "to protect the sacred liturgies, rites and doctrines of the traditional initiatory Orders from being appropriated and profaned by clandestine organizations." One of its leading founders was AMORC (Ancient Mystical Order Rosae Crucis). An AMORC document describes the nature of FUDOSI as follows:

Leadership and organisation
SAR, a title which means Son of Ra or Son Altesse Royale (His Royal Highness), was attached to all dignitaries of FUDOSI.  After the first organised convention in 1934, 12 members were chosen to form the Supreme Council, led by 3 imperators:

 Sar Hieronymus (Emile Dantinne) Imperator of Europe
 Sar Alden (Harvey Spencer Lewis) Imperator of the American continent
 Sar Yesir (Victor Blanchard) Imperator of "The Orient".

H. S. Lewis (Sar Alden) created the symbol of FUDOSI. After Lewis' death in 1939, his son Ralph Maxwell Lewis became one of the three imperators of FUDOSI, under the name Sar Validivar. In 1946  Andre Cordonnier became one of its imperators.

Associated organisations
Here is a list of the orders and societies represented on the first FUDOSI convention of 1934:

 Ordre de la Rose+Croix universelle (Sar Hieronymus) 
 Ordre de la Rose+Croix universitaire (Sar Hieronymus, Sar Elgrim)
 Ordre kabbalistique de la Rose+Croix (Sar Yesir representing Lucien Mauchel)
 Confrerie des Freres illumines de la Rose+Croix (Sar Amertis)
 A.M.O.R.C. U.S.A. (Sar Alden, Sar Emmanuel, Sar Iohannes)
 Militia crucifera evangelica (Sar Alden) 
 Ordre ancien et mystique de la Rose+Croix AMORC-Switzerland (Sar Amertis representing Sar Alkmaion) 
 Societe alchimique de France (Sar Amertis) 
 Ordre des Samaritains inconnus (Sar Amertis) 
 Ordre hermetiste tetramegiste et mystique or Ordre Pythagoricien (Sar Succus, Sar Helios)
 Ordre martiniste et synarchique (Sar Yesir) 
 Fraternite des Polaires (Sar Yesir) 
 Ordre maçonnique oriental de Memphis-Mizraim stricte observance (Sar Iohannes, Sar Ludovicus)
 Co-masonic Order of Memphis-Mizraim (Sar Laya, Sar Fulgur) 
 L'Eglise gnostique universelle (Tau Targelius = Victor Blanchard)
Ordre maçonnique oriental de Memphis-Misraim (stricte observance) and the Mixed Order of Memphis-Mizraim, the only Masonic organizations associated with FUDOSI, were expelled according to a decision taken by the three Imperators (Lewis, Dantinne, Blanchard) on August 1, 1935.

Position with respect to Masonry
A document by FUDOSI titled "Rapport sur les ordres et sociétés initiatiques. 12/10/1941", written by FUDOSI Imperator Emille Dantinne, states with regard to Freemasonry:

But the admission turned out to be an error. Later in the document we read:

These declarations may be considered inconsistent with the fact that Freemasonry requires its members to believe in a Supreme Being. It is unknown whether these views were exclusive to Emille Dantinne or held by more FUDOSI members, however Sar Alden was a member of the Antient Rite of Memphis-Misraim.

Dissolution
After the end of the 8th convention (August 14, 1951) FUDOSI dissolved after strong disagreements between Emile Dantinne and Ralph M. Lewis. The 8th convention ended after Ralph M. Lewis criticized Jean Mallinger (Sar Elgrim), a FUDOSI dignitary, for having a "problem" with AMORC for its admission of Afro-American members. The three Imperators signed an official document that marked the end of FUDOSI.

References

Rosicrucian organizations
Non-profit organisations based in Belgium